Good Advice is an American television sitcom that aired for two seasons on CBS from April 2, 1993, to September 6, 1994. It was co-created and executive produced by Danny Jacobson and Norma Safford Vela; and starred Shelley Long and Treat Williams.

Synopsis
Dr. Susan DeRuzza (Shelley Long) is a successful marriage therapist and the author of a best-selling book on the subject, Giving And Forgiving. Upon returning from a six-week promotional tour she discovers her husband of 11 years, Joey (Christopher McDonald), in bed with another woman. Furthermore, when she returns to her therapy office, she learns she is now sharing it with high-profile divorce attorney Jack Harold (Treat Williams). While Susan and Jack don't agree on the basics of relationships, love or marriage, the one thing they do share is an undeniable sexual chemistry. Susan's confidant, Artie (George Wyner), tries to lend support at the office and her sister Paige (Teri Garr) and son Michael (Ross Malinger) try to help at home.

Cast
Shelley Long as Susan DeRuzza
Treat Williams as Jack Harold
Christopher McDonald (season 1) and Peter Onorati (season 2) as Joey DeRuzza
Ross Malinger as Michael DeRuzza
Kiersten Warren as Lynn Casey (pilot only)
George Wyner as Artie Cohen
Estelle Harris as Ronnie Cohen (season 1)
Lightfield Lewis as Sean Trombitas
Henriette Mantel as Henriette Campbell (season 2)
Teri Garr as Paige Turner (season 2)

Guest stars
Wendie Malick as Janet
Anne Meara as Verna
Peter Onorati as Chazz Bigelow
Xander Berkeley as Bernard
Lisa Edelstein as Robin
Liz Torres as Juanita
Mindy Sterling as Jill
Jean Speegle Howard as Mrs. Coulson

Episodes

Season 1: 1993

Season 2: 1994

History
Good Advice was intended to debut at the very beginning of the 1992–1993 season, but became a mid-season replacement on CBS in spring 1993 because the network's fall schedule was overcrowded. The initial order garnered solid ratings and generally positive critical reviews. This was Shelley Long's first return to series television after leaving her role as Diane Chambers on Cheers and also the first sitcom for Treat Williams.

CBS renewed the series for a second season, set to premiere Friday, Oct. 22, 1993, but production was halted after Long became sick with the flu. Long's illness prompted the network to put the show on indefinite hiatus; the season premiere aired in the summer of 1994, but the show was cancelled after the season ended.

For the second season, Estelle Harris as Artie's mother and Christopher McDonald as Susan's ex-husband Joey were cut as regulars in lieu of bringing in Teri Garr as Susan's sister. Henriette Mantel also joined the cast in season 2.

Good Advice staff writers included Michael Patrick King and Max Mutchnick.

References

External links

1990s American sitcoms
1993 American television series debuts
1994 American television series endings
CBS original programming
English-language television shows
Television series by Sony Pictures Television
Television shows set in Los Angeles